Moray Tornadoes  are a Scottish ice hockey team that play in the Scottish National League. They play their games at Moray Leisure Centre in Elgin.

Ice hockey teams in Scotland